Samuel Goldman may refer to:

 Sir Samuel Goldman (civil servant) (1912–2007), British civil servant and international banker
 Samuel Goldman (sculptor) (1882–1969), sculptor and anarchist
 Sam Goldman (1916–1978), American professional footballer